Colin Dibley and John James were the defending champions, but did not participate this year.

Pat Cash and Chris Johnstone won the title, defeating Broderick Dyke and Wayne Hampson 6–3, 6–7, 7–6 in the final.

Seeds

  Syd Ball /  Rod Frawley (quarterfinals)
  John Alexander /  John Fitzgerald (first round)
  John Lloyd /  Bernard Mitton (first round)
  Bill Maze /  Hank Pfister (quarterfinals)

Draw

Draw

References
Draw

Next Generation Adelaide International
1982 Grand Prix (tennis)
1982 in Australian tennis